Samuel Alfred Craig (November 19, 1839 – March 17, 1920) was a Civil War soldier, attorney, and a Republican member of the U.S. House of Representatives from Pennsylvania.

Biography
Craig was born in Brookville, Pennsylvania. He attended the common schools of his native town and Jefferson College in Canonsburg, Pennsylvania. He learned the printer's trade and taught school.

He enlisted in the Union Army as a private April 19, 1861. He was promoted successively to second lieutenant, first lieutenant, and captain of Company B, One Hundred and Fifth Regiment, Pennsylvania Volunteer Infantry. He was commissioned captain in the Veteran Reserve Corps, United States Army, and served continuously four years and three months.

Following the war, Craig studied law, was admitted to the bar in 1876 and commenced practice in Brookville. He was elected district attorney of Jefferson County, Pennsylvania, in 1878.

Craig was elected as a Republican to the Fifty-first Congress. He was an unsuccessful candidate for renomination in 1890.

He resumed the practice of law in Brookville, where he died in 1920, aged 80.  He was interred in Brookville Cemetery.

References
 Retrieved on 2008-02-14
The Political Graveyard

1839 births
1920 deaths
Washington & Jefferson College alumni
Pennsylvania lawyers
Union Army officers
Republican Party members of the United States House of Representatives from Pennsylvania
19th-century American lawyers